Under Two Flags (1867) was a best-selling novel by Ouida. The most famous of her books, it tells the story of an English aristocrat, apparently in disgrace, who disappears and joins a French battalion in Algeria, loosely based on the Foreign Legion.

Plot
The novel is about The Hon. Bertie Cecil (nicknamed Beauty of the Brigades).

In financial distress because of his own profligacy and the loss of an important horse-race on which he has bet extensively, and falsely accused of forgery, but unable to defend himself against the charge without injuring the "honour" of a lady and also exposing his younger brother (the real culprit), Cecil fakes his own death and exiles himself to Algeria where he joins the Chasseurs d'Afrique, a regiment comprising soldiers from various countries, rather like the French Foreign Legion.
 
After Cecil's great childhood friend and the friend's beautiful sister show up in Africa, and after a series of melodramatic self-sacrifices by Cecil and by the young girl Cigarette, a "child of the Army" who sacrifices her life saving Cecil from a firing squad, the main conflicts are resolved and the surviving characters return to England to fortune, title, and love.

Adaptations

The book has also served as a basis for a number of stage and film adaptations.
Under Two Flags, a 1901 Broadway play by Paul M. Potter that ran for 135 performances at the Garden Theatre, starring Blanche Bates and Maclyn Arbuckle, directed by David Belasco and produced by Charles Frohman.
Under Two Flags (1912 film; there were two 1912 adaptations, according to IMDb).
 Under Two Flags, a 1915 short film starring Gertrude Astor
Under Two Flags (1916 film), a 1916 film starring Theda Bara
Under Two Flags (1922 film), a 1922 film directed by Tod Browning starring Priscilla Dean
Under Two Flags (1936 film), featuring Ronald Colman, Claudette Colbert, Victor McLaglen and Rosalind Russell
Classics Illustrated's 86th issue is a comic book adaptation of this book, with art by Maurice del Bourgo.

References

External links

1867 British novels
Novels by Ouida
English adventure novels
Novels set in Algeria
British novels adapted into plays
British novels adapted into films
Novels adapted into comics